Mesopteryx is a genus of mantises in the family Mantidae. It contains three species.

See also
List of mantis genera and species

References

Mantidae
Mantodea genera
Taxa named by Henri Louis Frédéric de Saussure